Henry (Hendrick) I. Van Rensselaer House, also known as Hudson Bush Farm, is a historic home located at Greenport in Columbia County, New York.  It was built in 1785 and is a large, rectangular, two story, brick dwelling measuring 55 feet wide by 40 feet deep.  It features a five bay central entrance front facade, second story Palladian window in the Georgian style, and is topped by a hipped roof.  Also on the property is a smoke house, built about 1785.

It was added to the National Register of Historic Places in 1993.

References

Houses completed in 1785
Houses on the National Register of Historic Places in New York (state)
Georgian architecture in New York (state)
Houses in Columbia County, New York
National Register of Historic Places in Columbia County, New York